Kanyosha is a commune of Bujumbura Rural Province in Burundi.

See also 

 Communes of Burundi

References 

Communes of Burundi
Bujumbura Province